The eleventh season of Bob's Burgers premiered on Fox on September 27, 2020, and ended on .

Production
This season featured guest appearances from Jack McBrayer, Andy Kindler, Jenny Slate, Phil LaMarr, Ken Jeong, Megan Mullally, Renée Taylor, Kevin Kline, and Bill Hader.

Release
The season premiered September 27, 2020. The season aired on Sundays as part of Fox's Animation Domination programming block, along with The Simpsons, Bless the Harts, The Great North, and Family Guy.
The season is available to stream on Disney+ in Australia under the Star Content hub.

Episodes

References

External links
Official website

2020 American television seasons
2021 American television seasons
Bob's Burgers seasons